The House of Tomorrow is a 1949 animated theatrical short directed by Tex Avery. It was part of a series of cartoons Avery did satirizing technology of the future which included: The Car of Tomorrow, The Farm of Tomorrow, and The T.V. of Tomorrow. These were satires of live action promotional films that were commonly shown in theaters at the time.

The film is a straightforward narrated showcase of appliances said to be found in a typical house in the year 2050, roughly a hundred years after the cartoon was made, each one actually an outlandish joke. Most of the time the inventions following a similar pattern of being made for each member of the family ending with a fatal version for the "mother-in-law".

Plot
An off-screen narrator introduces The House of Tomorrow, a pre-fabricated luxury residence that impossibly unfolds from a tiny gift box. The house has separate entrances for each member of the family: for Fido, a tiny door surrounded by bones; for Junior, a door covered in muddy handprints; for the mother, a wide and curvy door to accommodate her large form from eating sweets; for the father, a saloon door; and, for the mother-in-law, a heavily barricaded door with a welcome mat that reads "SCRAM!"

Once inside, the narrator offers a tour of the house's modern conveniences, presented as a series of brief vignettes consisting of sight gags. The house contains all of the following:

Carpeting so lush and deep that a passing butler sinks into it up to his neck
A climate control system that, at the push of a button, sends a raining thundercloud across the room
A trophy room where animal heads share space with a liquor bottle that was "killed" one New Year's Eve
A button to fool tax assessors by transforming the house's appearance into that of a dilapidated hovel
A machine to handle Junior's nonstop questions by yelling "Ahh, shaddap!" and plugging his mouth with a toilet plunger
An automatic sandwich maker that shuffles slices of bread and cold cuts like playing cards before "dealing" the sandwiches to diners
A tanning machine that flips the user with a giant spatula
A guest chair that can adjust its shape for any visitor, whether tall, short, or the mother-in law (for her, it transforms into an electric chair)
A three-screen television set the whole family can watch at once: a cooking show for the mother, a western for Junior, and, for the "tired businessman," film of a beautiful woman (Joi Lansing) in a bathing suit
Individual medicine cabinets for each member of the family; the father's and mother's are filled with various hygiene implements, Junior's contains a single large bottle of castor oil with a spoon, and the mother-in-law's is filled with vials of poison
An electric shaver that can remove not only stubble, but also almost all of a man's facial features
A toaster that pops its users up in the air instead of the toast
A juicer that removes the seeds from oranges by noisily spitting them into a spittoon
A frying pan that prevents bacon from curling by hitting it with a tiny mallet
An oven with a window to let one see everything inside (a roasting chicken screams for its modesty and pulls down a blind)
A device to remove the burps from radishes by making a literal burping sound as each one passes through
A pressure cooker that can cook an entire meal at once; it's shown that it does so via the heat from a catastrophic explosion which sends all the food airborne, along with the stunned housewife herself
A refrigerator with a built-in window for those curious about whether the light turns off when the door is closed; it reveals a little gnome-like creature pushing an "off" button each time.

As the narrator signs off, a typewritten letter suddenly appears on the screen:
PATRONS ATTENTION!!
Due to numerous requests of the tired business-men in the audience, we are going to show you the girl again.
The Management
The short then ends with a repeat of the film of Joi Lansing in her swimsuit.

See also
 What's Buzzin' Buzzard - A previous cartoon that also had a "Patrons Attention" at the end of it.

References

External links
 

1949 animated films
1949 short films
1949 films
1940s American animated films
1940s animated short films
Films directed by Tex Avery
Works about the future
Metro-Goldwyn-Mayer animated short films
Metro-Goldwyn-Mayer films
Films scored by Scott Bradley
Films produced by Fred Quimby
Films set in the future
Films set in 2050
Metro-Goldwyn-Mayer cartoon studio short films